Goodenia stenophylla is a species of flowering plant in the family Goodeniaceae and is endemic to the south-west coast of Western Australia. It is an erect shrub with linear or tapering leaves and racemes of white flowers with purplish spots.

Description
Flowering occurs from September to January.

Taxonomy and naming
Goodenia stenophylla was first formally described in 1859 by Ferdinand von Mueller in Fragmenta phytographiae Australiae. The specific epithet (stenophylla) means "narrow-leaved".

Distribution
This goodenia grows on the steep sides of rocks from the Fitzgerald River National Park to Bremer Bay in the Esperance Plains biogeographic region.

Conservation status
Goodenia stenophylla is classified as "Priority Four" by the Government of Western Australia Department of Parks and Wildlife, meaning that is rare or near threatened.

References

stenophylla
Eudicots of Western Australia
Plants described in 1859
Taxa named by Ferdinand von Mueller